Zaliztsi (Zaleshitz) (unit 1993, Zalozhtsi) is an urban-type settlement in Ternopil Raion (district) of Ternopil Oblast (province) in western Ukraine. It hosts the administration of Zaliztsi settlement hromada, one of the hromadas of Ukraine. Population:

History
Zaliztsi was first founded in 1483; the settlement was granted Magdeburg rights in 1520, and it acquired the status of an urban-type settlement in 1961.

Until 18 July 2020, Zaliztsi belonged to Zboriv Raion. The raion was abolished in July 2020 as part of the administrative reform of Ukraine, which reduced the number of raions of Ternopil Oblast to three. The area of Zboriv Raion was merged into Ternopil Raion.

References

Urban-type settlements in Ternopil Raion
Populated places established in the 1480s
Shtetls